The Metropolitan Pavilion is an exhibition venue located in the Chelsea neighborhood of Manhattan in New York City. Opened in 1992, the  venue offers four loft event spaces in one location. The Metropolitan Pavilion is situated next door to the old Altman Building, and on occasion, the two connected buildings are utilized as one extra-large event space.

The Metropolitan Pavilion has been host to comic book conventions, toy shows, art exhibitions, film festivals, fashion shows, food festivals, fencing tournaments, political fundraisers, weddings, and other gala events. These events include the Big Apple Comic Con, the Pinta Art Show, the Outsider Art Fair, and the American Folk Art Museum.

History 
The Metropolitan Pavilion was established in 1992 at 110 West 19th Street in Manhattan by entrepreneur Alan Boss who had a background in flea markets and vintage clothing. In 1999, the venue was expanded through the block, and changed its main address to 125 West 18th Street.

References

External links 
 

Convention centers in New York City
1992 establishments in New York City
Chelsea, Manhattan